Lieutenant-General Edmund Fielding (1676 – 20 June 1741) was a British Army officer.

Military career
Edmund Fielding was born in 1676, the son of John Fielding, canon of Salisbury. Fielding joined the English Army as an ensign in the 1st Foot Guards on 15 December 1696. He was promoted to captain some time before 1704, serving in Webb's Regiment of Foot. Fighting under Lord Marlborough in the War of the Spanish Succession, Fielding was present at the Battle of Blenheim on 13 August 1704. He was then promoted to major on 12 April 1706, serving in Lord Tunbridge's Regiment of Foot, before in around 1709 he succeeded Colonel Brazier in command of his own regiment of foot. He was placed on half pay in 1713 before on 11 March 1719 he raised what came to be known as the 41st Regiment of Foot from independent companies of invalids.

Fielding was promoted to brigadier in 1727, major-general in 1735 and to lieutenant-general in 1739. He married Sarah Gould and they had two sons, Henry Fielding, who became an English novelist and dramatist, and Sir John Fielding, a magistrate, and four daughters including the writer Sarah Fielding. He died in 1741.

References

Sources

1676 births
1741 deaths
British Army lieutenant generals
Fielding family